Perkinsiella saccharicida (known commonly as the sugarcane planthopper, sugarcane delphacid, and sugarcane leafhopper) is a species of delphacid planthopper in the family Delphacidae. It is found in Africa, Australia, North America, Oceania, and Southern Asia.

References

Further reading

 
 

Delphacini
Articles created by Qbugbot
Insects described in 1903